Henry William Johnson III (born March 20, 1958) is a former American football linebacker in the National Football League with the Minnesota Vikings. He played collegiately for the Georgia Tech football team.

1958 births
Living people
People from Jefferson County, Georgia
Players of American football from Georgia (U.S. state)
American football linebackers
Georgia Tech Yellow Jackets football players
Minnesota Vikings players